Bildad ( Bildaḏ;  Baldád), the Shuhite, was one of Job's three friends who visited the patriarch in the Hebrew Bible's Book of Job. He was a descendant of Shuah, son of Abraham and Keturah, whose family lived in the deserts of Arabia, or a resident of the district. In speaking with Job, his intent was consolation, but he became an accuser, asking Job what he has done to deserve God's wrath.

Speeches
In substance, they were largely an echo of what had been maintained by Eliphaz the Temanite, the first of Job's friends to speak, but charged with somewhat increased vehemence because he deemed Job's words so impious and wrathful. Bildad was the first to attribute Job's calamity to actual wickedness, albeit indirectly, by accusing his children (who were destroyed) of sin to warrant their punishment. His brief third speech, just five verses in length, marked the silencing of the friends.

See also 
Eliphaz
Zophar
 Elihu
 Bildad is also the name of one of the owners of the Pequod in Herman Melville's Moby-Dick.

Notes

References

Book of Job people
People whose existence is disputed